The Way Out is a 1915 American silent drama film featuring Harry Carey.

Cast
 Harry Carey
 Claire McDowell
 L. M. Wells (as Louis Wells)

See also
 Harry Carey filmography

External links

1915 films
American silent short films
American black-and-white films
1915 drama films
1915 short films
Films directed by Anthony O'Sullivan
Silent American drama films
1910s American films